The New Gary Puckett and the Union Gap Album is the fourth and final studio album by Gary Puckett & The Union Gap that contained all new material.  It was released in 1969.

Their version of the song "Don't Give in to Him" was released in March 1969 and hit No. 15 on the Billboard Hot 100 and No. 13 on the easy listening chart. The song "This Girl Is a Woman Now" was released in August 1969 and hit No. 9 on the Billboard Hot 100 and No. 2 on the easy listening chart.

The album landed on the Billboard 200 chart, reaching #50.

The album was arranged by Ernie Freeman.

Track listing 

Side 1
 "Home" (Mac Davis)
 "Stay Out of My World" (Gary Geld, Pater Udell)
 "Lullaby" (Gary Puckett)
 "Hard Tomorrow" (Kerry Chater, Gary Withem)
 "This Girl Is a Woman Now" (Alan Bernstein, Victor Millrose)

Side 2
 "My Son (version 2)" (Withem, Chater)
 "Simple Man" (Eddie Colville, Puckett)
 "Out in the Cold Again" (Dick Monda, Keith Colley)
 "Don't Give in to Him" (Gary Usher)
 "His Other Woman" (Chater, Doug Allen)

Chart positions

Singles

References

1969 albums
Gary Puckett & The Union Gap albums
Columbia Records albums